Lobelia anceps, commonly known as angled lobelia, is a small herbaceous plant in the family Campanulaceae it grows in several states of Australia, New Zealand, South America and South Africa. It is a small, perennial herb with blue to purple flowers.

Description

Taxonomy and naming
Lobelia anceps was first formally described in 1782 by Carl Linnaeus and the description was published in Supplementum Plantarum. The specific epithet (anceps) means "two-sided, double, flattened", referring to the leaves.

Distribution and habitat
Angled lobelia is found along the banks of pools, creeks and rivers along coastal areas in New South Wales, Victoria, Queensland and South Australia. In Western Australia it grows between the Mid West and Goldfields-Esperance regions of Western Australia in sandy-peat-clay soils over granite or limestone.

References

anceps
Flora of Western Australia
Plants described in 1782
Flora of Queensland
Flora of Tasmania
Flora of Victoria (Australia)
Flora of New South Wales